Gubanpo Station is a railway station on Line 9 of the Seoul Subway.

Prior to the opening of Line 9, it was planned to be called Seoritgae Station, but the name was changed due to various reasons posed by local residents.

Basic information (translation of Korean Wikipedia)
Gubanpo Station is a station located at 1053 Banpo-dong, Seocho-gu, Seoul. It opened on July 24, 2009 with the opening of Phase 1 of Seoul Subway Line 9 (Hangul:수도권 전철 9호선) . It is the 25th station from the starting/ending point, Gaehwa, and is 4 stations from Sinnonhyeon Station, the last station of Phase 1. It is 1.0 km from Dongjak Station, which is a transfer station with Line 4. It is also 1.5 km from Express Bus Terminal Station, where you can transfer to Lines 3 and 7.

Name
Gubanpo Station was originally planned to be named Seoritgae Station but was named Gubanpo Station because 6,700 residents disagreed naming the station by Seoritgae. (Seoritgae means ‘A stream of water flows round and round”. (Hangul: 개울물이 서리서리 굽이쳐 흐른다.)) There were three reasons why residents did not like the name Seoritgae.

1.	The Gubanpo area was never called ‘Seoritgae’ before and could actually confuse people with Seorae Village nearby.
2.	Seoritgae ends with ‘-gae’(‘-개’) which stands for ‘dog’ with may make people think of it as a bad word.
3.	The name has a bad connotation because Seori in Korean means ‘to raid on a person's property out of a mischievous motive.

Because of these reasons, residents requested to change the name to Gubanpo Station or Banpo-bon Dong Station and the name was changed to Gubanpo after a discussion.

People who agreed with the name ‘Seoritgae’ said that it could be chaotic because there would 3 stations in the area with the name ‘Banpo’, which are Gubanpo, Sinbanpo, and Banpo.

Station layout

Exits
 Isugyo
 Banpo Hangang Park
 Banpo Elementary and Middle School.

References

 
 Dong-a Prime Korean-English Dictionary
 
 :ko:구반포역

Railway stations opened in 2009
Seoul Metropolitan Subway stations
Metro stations in Seocho District